Obmochaev or Obmochayev is a Russian masculine surname, its feminine counterpart is Obmochaeva or Obmochayeva. It may refer to
Aleksey Obmochaev (born 1989), Russian volleyball player
Nataliya Obmochaeva (born 1989), Russian volleyball player, former wife of Aleksey

Russian-language surnames